The Eridanus Cluster is a  galaxy cluster roughly  from Earth, containing about 73 main galaxies and about 200 total galaxies. About 30% have Hubble classifications of elliptical or S0 and the remaining 70% are spiral or irregular. These galaxies reside in smaller groups which are all loosely gravitationally bound to each other, suggesting that the system is still condensing from the Hubble flow and may eventually form a cluster of about 1014 . A low velocity dispersion compared to that of, for example, the Coma cluster, supports this hypothesis. The Eridanus Cluster is located in the constellation Eridanus near the Fornax Cluster, and is sometimes called the "Fornax II Cluster".

Table of galaxies

See also
List of galaxy clusters
Coma Cluster
Fornax Cluster
Norma Cluster
Virgo Cluster

References

Eridanus (constellation)
Galaxy clusters
Southern Supercluster